James Hamilton Purves (born 4 December 1937) is a former English cricketer.  Purves was a left -handed batsman who bowled right-arm medium pace.  He was born in Hemel Hempstead, Hertfordshire and educated at Uppingham School.

Purves made his first-class debut for Essex against Cambridge University in 1960.  Following this match he played a first-class fixture for the Free Foresters against Oxford University.  The following season he made four further first-class appearances for Essex, the last of which came against Middlesex in the County Championship.  He struggled in his five first-class appearances for the county, scoring just 36 runs at an average of 5.14, with a high score of 14.  He made a further first-class appearance for the Free Foresters in 1961, followed this up in 1962 by making two more for the team.  Also in 1962, Purves made his only first-class appearance for the Marylebone Cricket Club against Cambridge University.  In 1964, he made his final first-class appearance for the Free Foresters against Oxford University.  He fared better with the bat for the Free Foresters, scoring 422 runs in his five matches at an average of 42.20, with a high score of 74.  This score, which was one of four fifties he made for the club, came against Cambridge University in 1962.

References

External links
James Purves at ESPNcricinfo
James Purves at CricketArchive

1937 births
English cricketers
Essex cricketers
Free Foresters cricketers
Living people
Marylebone Cricket Club cricketers
People educated at Uppingham School
Sportspeople from Hemel Hempstead